Hydraulic resistance may refer to:

 hydraulic resistance training, a form of strength training
 hydraulic conductivity